The Pentecostal Movement in Chile began in the Methodist Episcopal Church in 1902, in Valparaiso, under the pastorship of an American missionary, Rev. Dr. Willis C. Hoover K.

Today, about 15% of the Chilean population identifies as Pentecostal. The largest Pentecostal denominations represented in Chile are:
 Iglesia Evangelica Pentecostal - Evangelical Pentecostal Church - in 17 countries, including United States
 Iglesia Metodista Pentecostal - Pentecostal Methodist Church - in 4 countries
 Iglesia Pentecostal de Chile - Pentecostal Church of Chile (She used to have a mission in Brooklyn, New York)
 Iglesia Unida Metodista Pentecostal - United Pentecostal Methodist Church - in 7 countries
Pentecostal missions from United States (Assemblies of God, Church of God, The Foursquare Church) arrived in Chile in the late 1950s.

References

Pentecostalism in South America
Protestantism in Chile